T Centauri is a variable star located in the far southern constellation Centaurus. It varies between magnitudes 5.56 and 8.44 over 181.4 days, making it intermittently visible to the naked eye. Pulsating between spectral classes K0:e and M4II:e, it has been classed as a semiregular variable, though Sebastian Otero of the American Association of Variable Star Observers has noted its curve more aligned with RV Tauri variable stars and has classified it as one.

References

Centaurus (constellation)
Semiregular variable stars
Centauri, T
Durchmusterung objects
119090
066825
K-type giants
5147
M-type bright giants
Asymptotic-giant-branch stars
RV Tauri variables